Andžejs Ļebedevs (born 4 November 1994) is a Latvian speedway rider.

Career
Ļebedevs finished in 16th place during the 2022 Speedway World Championship, after securing 26 points during the 2022 Speedway Grand Prix. He was selected as a reserve for the 2023 Speedway Grand Prix. Also in 2022, he helped Wilki Krosno win the 2022 1.Liga.

Major results

World individual Championship

Individual European Championship

U21 World Championship 
 Individual Speedway Junior World Championship
 2012 – 20th place
 2013 – 4th place

U21 European Championship 
 Individual Speedway Junior European Championship
 2011 – 13th place
 2012 – 7th place
 2013 – Silver medal

Clubs 
Polish league:
Lokomotiv Daugavpils (2011–2016)
Sparta Wrocław (2017-2018)
Wilki Krosno (since 2021)
Swedish league:
Masarna Avesta (2011)
Rospiggarna (2014–2016)
Eskilstuna Smederna (2017-2018)
United Kingdom:
King's Lynn Stars (2013)
Speedway Bundesliga:
AC Landshut Devils (2015-2017)

Clubs Championships

See also 
 Latvia national speedway team
 List of Speedway Grand Prix riders

References

External links
SEC Speedway Euro Championship
LaMSF

1994 births
Living people
Latvian speedway riders
Sportspeople from Daugavpils
Place of birth missing (living people)